Geneforge 5: Overthrow is the fifth and final video game in the Geneforge series of role-playing video game created by Spiderweb Software.

Features
Unlike the first four Geneforge games, the player can choose between the original three classes (Shaper, Guardian, and Agent), as well as six rebel classes (Warrior, Infiltrator, Servile, Lifecrafter, Shock Trooper and Sorceress).

The screen in Geneforge 5 is considerably larger, with a bigger map and smaller icons, leaving much more room for viewing. The graphics were improved in numerous aspects, with better animations and cut-scenes than the first three games. The plot is more akin to that of Geneforge 2 in that there are multiple factions which the player can join, whereas in the third and fourth games there are only two major factions available to the player.

Plot
In the beginning of the game, the player wakes up from an amnesiac trance, with no memory of the past. The player is in the service of Shaper Rawal, a powerful Shaper who seeks to use the player to increase his own political power. After performing a few tasks for him, he releases the player from his mountains, letting the player travel the world.

Wherever the player travels there are various sects one of which the player can join. The Councillor Astoria, wishes to have peace with the rebellion. In a far eastern area of Astoria's domain, the player meets the former Shaper Litalia, who wishes them to join the Trakovites, a radical sect that supports the complete abandonment of all Shaping whatsoever. To the south the player encounters the main front of the war against the rebels General Alwan, who has been badly wounded in a war against the rebels and is confined to a life-support device and opposes any peace whatsoever. Even further south the player meets Sage Taygen, a mad, yet powerful Shaper who wishes to attain peace by creating a strain of bacteria that will wipe out all creations, giving the Shapers a blank slate to start anew. Finally, East of Alwan's lands is the Rebel domain, led by Ghaldring who wishes the player to kill the leaders of the other four sects in order to complete his rebellion.

As with the other Geneforge games, the player has complete freedom to join whichever sect they wish; this choice, along with a few other factors (such as canister use), determines the ending of the saga.

References
http://www.spiderwebsoftware.com/geneforge5/index.html

External links

Geneforge 5: Overthrow main page
Spiderweb Software

2008 video games
MacOS games
Role-playing video games
Spiderweb Software games
Video games developed in the United States
Video games featuring protagonists of selectable gender
Video games with isometric graphics
Windows games
Single-player video games